Charleen Abigaile "Cha" Ramos Cruz-Behag (born May 11, 1988) is a Filipino professional volleyball player and an educator. She is a member of the Philippine women's national volleyball team. Currently, she is playing and is the team captain for the F2 Logistics Cargo Movers in the Philippine Super Liga, a semi-professional corporate club volleyball league in the Philippines. She was a member of De La Salle University (DLSU) Lady Spikers, the official women's volleyball varsity team of De La Salle University. She was a two-time University Athletic Association of the Philippines's (UAAP) Finals Most Valuable Player and was part of DLSU Lady Spikers' four UAAP championships. She is known for her versatility in playing the sport of volleyball earning her the moniker "Ms. Everything".

Personal life
Cruz was born on May 11, 1988. She studied in the St. Louis College of Valenzuela high school from 2003 to 2006 and completed her Bachelor's in Psychology at De La Salle University and as of 2012 was pursuing her Master's degree in Special Education. She is the older sister of volleyball players Camille Cruz and Cienne Cruz.

Cruz married pilot Rey Behag on February 28, 2018, in Tagaytay. In October 2019, she gave birth to her son, Leon Sol.

Career
Cruz is known for her versatility and multidimensional skills in playing volleyball. Over the years of playing, she has played every position except libero and has embraced the 7th woman role for the DLSU Lady Spikers. According to her: "Kung sino yung nagkamali, or sino yung medyo off sa game, I’ll replace them. So even setter, even center spiker, utility or open spiker I played." This all-around athleticism in playing the sport and her ability to transition from setter to all spiking positions earned her the moniker "Miss Everything". However, she completed playing the final position of libero during the Battle of the Rivals last July 16, 2017.

Cruz began playing volleyball during her 6th grade. She abruptly took a break in the succeeding years but picked it up again during high school. She was later recruited by Coach Ramil De Jesus for the DLSU Lady Spikers varsity team and played for the team from 2005 to 2012.

Her first three years in her collegiate career was a shaky journey. Midway during her UAAP rookie year (Season 68, 2005–2006), while doing the setting job for the team, she sustained a stress fracture in her left ankle which forced her to sit out the remaining games of the season. While in the following UAAP season (Season 69, 2006–07), all DLSU varsity teams were suspended from the athletic association as consequence of its men's basketball team's violation on a UAAP rule. In UAAP Season 70 (2007–08), Cruz-Behag failed to suit up for the team due to academic requirements.

In 2008, Cruz finally returned to suit up for the team this time playing the open spiker and middle blocker positions. The DLSU Lady Spikers only dropped two matches in UAAP Season 71 (2008-2009) winning the championship title over the Far Eastern Lady Tamaraws. However, in Season 72 (2009–10), the DLSU Lady Spikers were dethroned by the University of Santo Tomas (UST) Lady Tigers and finished as runner up.

In her last two UAAP seasons [Seasons 73 (2010–11) and 74 (2011–12)], Cruz was named team captain for the DLSU Lady Spikers. In both seasons, the team won the championships and Cruz was awarded the UAAP Finals Most Valuable Player for both seasons. Eventually, the back-to-back championships turned into a 3-peat as the DLSU Lady Spikers again won the UAAP Women's Volleyball championship in Season 75.

After exhausting her UAAP playing years, Cruz temporarily took a break from playing volleyball and focused on her teaching job. She is currently finishing her master's degree in education major in special education at De La Salle University.

After a two-year hiatus, in 2014, Cruz made a comeback via the now defunct AirAsia Flying Spikers, reuniting with Coach Ramil de Jesus and other DLSU Lady Spikers. Currently, she is the team captain of the F2 Logistics Cargo Movers in the Philippine Super Liga.

Clubs
  AirAsia Flying Spikers (2014)
  Generika Lifesavers (2014)
  Shopinas.com Lady Clickers (2015)
  Meralco Power Spikers (2015)
  Cignal HD Spikers (2015)
  F2 Logistics Cargo Movers (2016–present)

Awards (Partial list)

Individuals
 UAAP Season 73 "Finals Most Valuable Player"
 UAAP Season 74 "Finals Most Valuable Player"
 2015 Philippine Superliga All-Filipino Conference "1st Best Outside Spiker"

Collegiate
Partial list, pre-season tournaments (PVF, Unigames, Shakey's V-League) not included
 UAAP Season 68 volleyball tournaments -  Champions, with DLSU Lady Spikers
 UAAP Season 69 volleyball tournaments - Entire DLSU varsity teams suspended from the UAAP
 UAAP Season 70 volleyball tournaments - Cruz-Behag did not suit up
 UAAP Season 71 volleyball tournaments -  Champions, with DLSU Lady Spikers
 UAAP Season 72 volleyball tournaments -  Silver medal, with DLSU Lady Spikers
 UAAP Season 73 volleyball tournaments -  Champions, with DLSU Lady Spikers
 UAAP Season 74 volleyball tournaments -  Champions, with DLSU Lady Spikers

Clubs
 2014 PSL Grand Prix Conference -  Silver medal, with Generika LifeSavers (now Generika-Ayala Lifesavers)
 2015 PSL All-Filipino Conference -  Silver medal, with Shopinas.com Lady Clickers
 2016 PSL Invitational Cup -  Bronze medal, with F2 Logistics Cargo Movers
 2016 PSL All-Filipino Conference -  Champions, with F2 Logistics Cargo Movers
 2016 PSL Grand Prix Conference -  Bronze medal, with F2 Logistics Cargo Movers
 2017 PSL All-Filipino Conference -  Silver medal, with F2 Logistics Cargo Movers
 2017 PSL Grand Prix Conference -  Champions, with F2 Logistics Cargo Movers
 2018 PSL Grand Prix Conference -  Silver medal, with F2 Logistics Cargo Movers
 2018 PSL Invitational Cup -  Champions, with F2 Logistics Cargo Movers
 2018 PSL All-Filipino Conference -  Silver medal, with F2 Logistics Cargo Movers

Beach Volleyball
 2015 Nestea Fantasy Beach Volleyball,  Champions, with Light Blue Team composed of Cruz, Michele Gumabao, Rachel Anne Daquis, and Gretchen Ho

Recognition
 2015, FHM Philippines 100 Sexiest Woman, ranked No. 98
 2015 DLSAA Lasallian Sports Achievement Award
 2015 season of the Philippine Super Liga's brand ambassador

References

Living people
Filipino women's volleyball players
1988 births
University Athletic Association of the Philippines volleyball players
De La Salle University alumni
People from Valenzuela, Metro Manila
Volleyball players from Metro Manila
Outside hitters
Volleyball players at the 2018 Asian Games
Asian Games competitors for the Philippines